Vuk Karadžić (born June 24, 1996) is a Serbian professional basketball player for KK Dynamic Belgrade of the Basketball League of Serbia.

Professional career
Karadžić played for OKK Beograd, Smederevo 1953 and Kragujevački Radnički.

In February 2018, he joined Spartak Subotica. On February 21, he made his debut for the Spartak in a game against Dunav Stari Banovci.

International career 
Karadžić was a member of the Serbian U-18 national basketball team that won the silver medal at the 2014 FIBA Europe Under-18 Championship.

Personal life 
His father Stevan Karadžić is a professional basketball coach and former player. His mother Vesna Karadžić is a former basketball player.

References

External links
 Player Profile at eurobasket.com
 Player Profile at FIBA
 Player Profile at realgm.com

1996 births
Living people
Basketball players from Belgrade
Basketball League of Serbia players
BKK Radnički players
KK Mladost Zemun players
KK Smederevo players
KK Slodes players
KK Spartak Subotica players
KKK Radnički players
OKK Beograd players
Serbian men's basketball players
Guards (basketball)